Ovinishchi is a rural locality (a village) in Kupriyanovskoye Rural Settlement, Gorokhovetsky District, Vladimir Oblast, Russia. The population was 22 as of 2010.

Geography 
Ovinishchi is located near the Oka River, 18 km southeast of Gorokhovets (the district's administrative centre) by road. Kopsovo is the nearest rural locality.

References 

Rural localities in Gorokhovetsky District